The Burgerbibliothek of Berne is a public library located at Münstergasse 63 in Berne, Switzerland.
 
The origins of this institution can be traced back to the Reformation. 
Until 1951 it belonged jointly to the city and the University of Bern, and was supported by the Canton of Berne and by the Community of Burghers of Berne. 

The collection of the library includes the illustrated late mediaeval historical chronicle Berner Chronik written by Diebold Schilling the Elder, Liber ad honorem Augusti. It contains about 30 000 pictorial documents about Berne and about 1 000 precious codices, some of them from the late antiquity. 

The library includes collections inherited from the following collectors:
 Eduard Bähler
 Philipp Emanuel von Fellenberg
 Jeremias Gotthelf
 Johann Rudolf Gruner
 Kurt Guggisberg (part of inheritance)
 Albrecht von Haller
 Karl Howald
 Ernst Kreidolf
 Rudolf Münger
 Rudolf Abraham von Schiferli
 Gottlieb Samuel Studer
 Rudolf von Tavel

See also 
 Fragmenta Bernensia
Bern Riddles

Further reading 

Die Burgerbibliothek Bern. Archiv, Bibliothek, Dokumentationsstelle. Stämpfli, Bern 2002,  (Festschrift zum 50-jährigen Jubiläum).

External links 

 Homepage Burgerbibliothek
 Burgerbibliothek of Bern
 Manuscripts hold at the Burgerbibliothek via http://www.e-codices.unifr.ch.

Bern
Bern
Buildings and structures in Bern